Ruthven, Scotland can refer to the following:

 Ruthven, Badenoch;
 Ruthven Barracks, the ruin of a British government army garrison there.
 Ruthven, Aberdeenshire, near Huntly
 Aberuthven in Perth and Kinross